This is a list of the Armenian Catholicoi of Cilicia of the Holy See of Cilicia (full name: the Armenian Catholicosate of the Great House of Cilicia).
The Armenian patriarchate was transferred from Armenia to Cilicia in 1058. Although the see at Echmiadzin was restored in 1441, the Cilician catholicosate continued in existence, and continues to exist to the present day. Today the see is located in Antelias, Lebanon.  The Catholicos of Armenia and All Armenians claims sovereignty over the Catholicos of Cilicia, though the latter operates independently.

Catholicoi
(Name in English, dates, Armenian name)

The Catholicoi of the Great House of Cilicia (the traditional name of the Holy See) include:

Sivas era, 1058–1062, Tavbloor era, 1062–1066
Khachik II of Armenia, Khachik II of Ani, Khachik II of Cilicia (1058–1065) -- Խաչիկ Բ. Անեցի

Dzamendav (Zamidia) era, 1066–1116
Gregory II the Martyrophile (1066–1105) -- Գրիգոր Բ. Վկայասէր
Parsegh of Cilicia (1105–1113) -- Բարսեղ Ա. Անեցի

Dzovk era, 1116–1150, Hromgla era, 1150–1293
Gregory III of Cilicia (1113–1166) -- Գրիգոր Գ. Պահլաւունի
Nerses IV the Graceful (1166–1173) -- Սուրբ Ներսէս Դ. Կլայեցի (Շնորհալի) 
Gregory IV the Young (1173–1193) -- Գրիգոր Դ. Տղայ
Gregory V of Cilicia (1193–1194) -- Գրիգոր Ե. Քարավէժ
Gregory VI of Cilicia (1194–1203) -- Գրիգոր Զ. Ապիրատ proclaimed communion with Rome.
Barsegh II Anetsi (1195–1206) (rival catholicosate in historical Armenia set up after schism in the Armenian Church)
John VI the Affluent (1203–1221) -- Յովհաննէս Զ. Սսեցի
David III of Arkʻakałin (1207–1212) (catholicosate in Arkʻakałin due to Leo I decision) -- Դաւիթ Գ. Արքակաղնինեցի
Constantine I of Cilicia (1221–1267) -- Կոնստանդին Ա. Բարձրբերդցի
Jacob I the Learned (1268–1286) -- Յակոբ Ա. Կլայեցի
Constantine II the Woolmaker (1286–1289) -- Կոնստանդին Բ. Կատուկեցի
Stephen IV of Cilicia (1290–1293) -- Ստեփանոս Դ. Հռոմկլայեցի

Sis era, 1293–1930
Gregory VII of Cilicia (1293–1307) -- Գրիգոր Է. Անաւարզեցի
Constantine II the Woolmaker (restored) (1307–1322) -- Կոնստանդին Բ.
Constantine III of Cilicia (1323–1326) -- Կոնստանդին Դ. Լամբրոնացի
Jacob II of Cilicia (1327–1341), d. 1359—Յակոբ Բ. Անաւարզեցի 
Mekhitar I of Cilicia (1341–1355) -- Մխիթար Ա. Գռներցի
Jacob II of Cilicia (restored) (1355–1359) -- Յակոբ Բ. Անաւարզեցի
Mesrop I of Cilicia (1359–1372) -- Մեսրոպ Ա. Արտազեցի
Constantine IV of Cilicia (1372–1374) -- Կոնստանդին Ե. Սսեցի 
Paul I of Cilicia (1374–1382) -- Պօղոս Ա. Սսեցի
Theodore II of Cilicia (1382–1392) -- Թէոդորոս Բ. Կիլիկեցի
Karapet of Cilicia (1393–1404) -- Կարապետ Ա. Կեղեցի
Jacob III of Cilicia (1404–1411) -- Յակոբ Գ. Սսեցի
Gregory VIII of Cilicia (1411–1418) -- Գրիգոր Ը.  Խանձողատ
Paul II of Cilicia (1418–1430) -- Պօղոս Բ. Գառնեցի
Constantine V of Cilicia (1430–1439) -- Կոնստանդին Զ. Վահկացի
Gregory IX of Cilicia (1439–1446) -- Գրիգոր Ժ. Ջալալբեկեանց

During Gregory IX's reign, the Mother See of Holy Echmiadzin was illegally restored, 1441.
 
For a separate list of Catholicoi at the Mother See of Holy Echmiadzin, see List of Catholicoi of Armenia.

Karapet II of Cilicia (1446–1477) -- Կարապետ Ա. Եւդոկացի
Stepanos I of Cilicia (1475–1483) -- Ստեփանոս Ա. Սարաձորցի 
Hovhannes I of Cilicia (1483–1488) -- Յովհաննէս Ա. Անտիոքցի
Hovhannes II of Cilicia (1489–1525) -- Յովհաննէս Բ. Թլկուրանցի
Hovhannes III of Cilicia (1525–1539) -- Յովհաննէս Գ. Քիլիսցի (Կայծակն, Կայծառ)
Simeon I of Cilicia (1539–1545) -- Սիմէոն Ա. Զէյթունցի 
Ghazar I (1545–1547) -- Ղազար Ա. Զէյթունցի 
Toros I of Cilicia (1548–1553) -- Թորոս Ա. Սսեցի 
Khachatour I of Cilicia (1553–1558) -- Խաչատուր Ա. Չորիկ 
Khachatour II of Cilicia (1560–1584) -- Խաչատուր Բ. Զէյթունցի (Խաչիկ Ուլնեցի, Երաժիշտ)
Azaria I of Cilicia (1584–1601) -- Ազարիա Ա. Ջուղայեցի
Hovhannes IV of Cilicia (1601–1621) -- Յովհաննէս Դ. Այնթափցի
Petros I of Cilicia (coadjutor) (1601–1608) -- Պետրոս Ա.
Minas of Cilicia (1621–1632) -- Մինաս Ա. Սսեցի (Կարնեցի, Թացախ)
Simeon II of Cilicia (1633–1648) -- Սիմէոն Բ. Սեբաստացի 
Nerses I of Cilicia—Ներսէս Ա. Սեբաստացի
Toros II of Cilicia (1654–1657) -- Թորոս Բ. Սեբաստացի
Khachatour III of Cilicia (1657–1677) -- Խաչատուր Գ. Գաղատացի (Մինտերճի, Մինտերճեան) 
Sahak I of Cilicia (1677–1683) -- Սահակ Ա. Քիլիսցի (Մէյխանեճի, Մէյխանեճեան) 
Azaria II of Cilicia (1683–1686) -- Ազարիա Բ. 
Grigor II of Cilicia (1686–1695) -- Գրիգոր  Բ. Ատանացի (Պիծակն)
Astvatsatour (1695–1703) -- Աստուածատուր Ա. Սասունցի (Նարին) 
Madteos (1703–1705) -- Մատթէոս Ա. Կեսարացի (Սարի) 
Hovhannes V (1705–1721) -- Յովհաննէս Ե. Հաճընցի 
Grigor III (1721/2–1729) -- Գրիգոր Գ. Կեսարացի (Ուղուրլու, Ուղուրլեան)
Hovhannes VI (1729/30–1731) -- Յովհաննէս Զ. Հաճընցի (Տէր Ադամ) 
Ghougas I of Cilicia (1731–1737) -- Ղուկաս Ա. Աջապահեան (Աջապահ, Աջապան, Սսեցի) 
Michael I of Cilicia (1737–1758) -- Միքայէլ Ա. Աջապահեան (Սսեցի) 
Gabriel of Cilicia (1758–1770) -- Գաբրիէլ Ա. Աջապահեան (Սսեցի) 
Yeprem I of Cilicia (1770–1784) -- Եփրեմ Ա. Աջապահեան (Սսեցի) 
Toros III of Cilicia (1784–1796) -- Թէոդորոս Գ. Աջապահեան (Սսեցի) (Թորոս Գ. Սսեցի) 
Kirakos I of Cilicia (1797–1822) -- Կիրակոս Ա. Աջապահեան (Սսեցի, Մեծն, Մեծագործ)
Yeprem II of Cilicia (1822–1833) -- Եփրեմ Բ. Աջապահեան (Սսեցի, Տեր-Մանուէլեան) 
Michael II of Cilicia (1833–1855) -- Միքայէլ Բ. Աջապահեան (Սսեցի, Ղուկասեան)
Kirakos II of Cilicia (1855–1866) -- Կիրակոս Բ. Աջապահեան (Սսեցի)
Megerdich I of Cilicia (1871–1894) -- Մկրտիչ Ա. Քեֆսիզեան (Մարաշցի)
vacant (1894–1902)

Sis (1902 - 1921), Aleppo (1921 - 1930), and Antelias era, Lebanon since 1930
Sahak II of Cilicia (1902–1939) -- Սահակ Բ. Խապայեան (Եղեգցի) 
Babken I of Cilicia (Coadjutor) (1931–1936) -- Բաբգէն Ա.
Bedros IV of Cilicia (1940) -- Պետրոս Դ. Սարաճեան 
vacant (1940–1943) 
Karekin I of Cilicia (1943–1952) -- Գարեգին Ա. Յովսէփեան 
vacant (1952–1956)
Zareh I (1956–1963) -- Զարեհ Ա. Փայասլեան 
Khoren I (1963–1983) -- Խորէն Ա. Բարոյեան 
Karekin II (Cilicia) (Catholicos Coadjutor) (1977–1983)
Karekin II (Cilicia) (1983–1994),  Catholicos after having served as Coadjutor to Khoren I for 6 years. Upon death of Vazgen I, Catholicos Karekin II was elected Catholicos of Armenia and of All Armenians and became known as Karekin I from 1994–1999 
Aram I (1994–present)

See also
Catholicos of All Armenians
List of Catholicoi of all Armenians
List of Armenian Patriarchs of Jerusalem
List of Armenian Patriarchs of Constantinople
List of Armenian Catholic Patriarchs of Cilicia

References
 Kiuleserian, Babgen. Պատմութիւն Կաթողիկոսաց Կիլիկիոյ (1441-էն մինչեւ մեր օրերը) [History of the Cilician Catholicosate (From 1441 to our days)] Antelias: Dprevanuts, 1939.

External links
Official site of the Armenian Catholicosate of the Great House of Cilicia

Christianity-related lists
Armenian
Cilicia
Armenian Catholicoi
Armenians of Cilicia